After Dark, My Sweet is a 1955 American crime novel by Jim Thompson.

Plot
William Collins is a former boxer with a deadly accident in his past.  Collins has broken out of his fourth mental hospital and met a con man and a beautiful woman, whose plans for him include murder and kidnapping.

Film adaptation
The novel was adapted into a film of the same name in 1990.

References

Novels by Jim Thompson
American novels adapted into films
1955 American novels
English-language novels